Coon Creek may refer to:

Settlements
 Coon Creek Township, Lyon County, Minnesota

Watercourses
In Missouri
 Coon Creek (Big Creek), a stream in Missouri
 Coon Creek (Deane Creek), a stream in Missouri
 Coon Creek (Elk Fork Salt River), a stream in Missouri
 Coon Creek (Lake Taneycomo), a stream in Missouri
 Coon Creek (Osage River), a stream in Missouri
 Coon Creek (South Fork Fabius River), a stream in Missouri
 Coon Creek (Perche Creek), a stream in Missouri
 Coon Creek (Pettis County, Missouri), a stream in Missouri
 Coon Creek (Spring River), a stream in Missouri
 Coon Creek (West Fork Cuivre River), a stream in Missouri

Elsewhere
 Coon Creek (Blue Earth River), a stream in Iowa and Minnesota
 Coon Creek (Redwood River), a stream in Minnesota
 Coon Creek (California), a tributary of the Santa Ana River
 Coon Creek (Nebraska), a river in Jefferson County, Nebraska
 Coon Creek (Niobrara River tributary), a stream in Rock County, Nebraska

Geology
 Coon Creek Falls, near Spencer, Tennessee, in Fall Creek Falls State Park
 Coon Creek Formation, a geologic formation located in western Tennessee and extreme northeast Mississippi

Other
 Coon Creek Girls, an all-girl "string band" in the Appalachian style of folk music

See also
 Raccoon Creek (disambiguation)